Return to Warbow is a 1958 American Western film directed by Ray Nazarro and starring Philip Carey. The film is based on the novel Return to Warbow by Les Savage, Jr. (New York, 1955).

Plot
Philip Carey plays Clay Hollister, an escaped prisoner, who returns to his native town of Warbow together with two accomplices, Red and Johnny, to recover $30,000 that he stashed there 11 years before. To achieve his goal, he takes local boy David Fallam (Christopher Olsen) hostage—only to learn later that the boy is his son.

Cast
Philip Carey as Clay Hollister
Catherine McLeod as Kathleen Fallam
Andrew Duggan as Murray Fallam
William Leslie as Johnny
Robert J. Wilke as Red
James Griffith as Frank Hollister
Jay Silverheels as Indian Joe
Christopher Olsen as David Fallam
Harry Lauter as Tom - Deputy Sheriff

Production
The film was shot at the Corriganville Ranch at Simi Valley and the Iverson Movie Ranch at Chatsworth, Los Angeles, California, from July 22 to August 2, 1957.

References

External links
 

1958 films
1958 Western (genre) films
1950s English-language films
American Western (genre) films
Films directed by Ray Nazarro
Columbia Pictures films
1950s American films